

Characters
+1 Records
-ismist Recordings

0–9

See also 

List of electronic music record labels
List of independent UK record labels
List of record labels in Pakistan

External links
45cat.com - record labels listed by country
discogs.com - searchable by label

simple:List of record labels#0–9